Starr Piano Company Warehouse and Administration Building were two historic buildings located at Richmond, Wayne County, Indiana.  The Administration Building was built about 1900, and was a two-story, five sided, brick industrial building.

It was listed on the National Register of Historic Places in 1981 and delisted in 1995.

References

External links

Historic American Engineering Record in Indiana
Industrial buildings and structures on the National Register of Historic Places in Indiana
Industrial buildings completed in 1900
Buildings and structures in Richmond, Indiana
National Register of Historic Places in Wayne County, Indiana